The "Saucy Jacky" postcard is the name given to a postcard received by the Central News Agency of London and postmarked 1 October 1888. The author of the postcard claims to have been the unidentified serial killer known as Jack the Ripper.

Because so many hoax letters were received by Scotland Yard, the press and others, it is unknown whether this was an authentic letter written by the Whitechapel murderer. The postcard did contain information deemed compelling enough to lead investigators to publish a facsimile of the communication in hopes that someone might recognise the handwriting.

Text
Postmarked and received on 1 October 1888, the postcard mentions that the two victims killed on 30 September were killed very close to one another, stating: "double event this time". Elizabeth Stride and Catherine Eddowes were both killed in the early morning of 30 September, and part of Eddowes' ear was found detached at the crime scene as a result of facial mutilations that the killer performed. Some authors have argued that the letter was sent before the murders were publicised, making it unlikely that a hoaxer would have such knowledge of the crime, but the letter was postmarked more than 24 hours after the killings took place, long after many details were known by journalists and residents of the area.

The text of the postcard reads:

Later revelations
Police officials later claimed to have identified a specific journalist as the author of this postcard and the earlier "Dear Boss" letter. In 1931, journalist Fred Best of The Star claimed he and a colleague at the newspaper had written all the letters signed "Jack the Ripper" in order to "keep the business alive".

In the years after the Ripper murders, the Saucy Jacky postcard disappeared from the police files. Although the "Dear Boss" letter was recovered in 1987, the "Saucy Jacky" postcard is still missing.

In 2018, a forensic linguistic analysis found strong linguistic evidence suggesting that this postcard and the "Dear Boss" letter were written by the same person.

References

Sources

1888 documents
Jack the Ripper
Postcards